Paul Ramon may refer to:

 Paul Ramon, pseudonym of Paul McCartney
 Paul Ramon Matia (born 1937), American judge